is an arcade game which was released by Namco in 1986. It is the sequel to Mappy, which was released three years earlier. The game was ported to the Wii Virtual Console in Japan on June 2, 2009.

Gameplay

In Hopping Mappy players control the Micro Police mouse, Mappy, as he bounces on a pogo stick to run circles around pink cats, called Meowkies, who patrol either vertically or horizontally. There is also Goro, a cat who patrols in a zigzag pattern, but he needs to take occasional breaks. There are eight treasures that a player must grab to complete a round, except on the bonus round where the player will just want to collect all the balloons that he can. The main intrigue here is getting past a blockade of Meowkies. The player controls are simple - he can bounce in any of the four directions, the only places he can land are the centres of the checkerboard squares (making for very few locations overall), and he will move at the same speed as the cats. If the player pushes the accelerator button and runs around, he will go twice as fast. If the player takes too long to complete the level, a "Hurry Up" warning will appear and the cats will speed up, matching Mappy's accelerated speed.  If the player takes too long again after the warning, a blue Gosenzo Coin will appear and chase the player.  This coin is faster than Mappy and will eventually kill the player unless he collects the final treasure before it reaches him.

Reception
In Japan, Game Machine listed Hopping Mappy as being the 13th most-popular arcade game of April 1986.

Legacy 
The game is included in the arcade compilation title Pac-Man's Pixel Bash. A theme based on the game, was released as free DLC for Pac-Man 99 post-launch, featuring visuals and sound from the game.

Notes

References

External links

Mappy
Arcade video games
Mobile games
Nintendo Switch games
PlayStation 4 games
Video games about mice and rats
Video games about police officers
Video games developed in Japan
Virtual Console games
Action video games
1986 video games
Namco arcade games
Hamster Corporation games